TV Magazine is a weekly French television listings magazine owned by Groupe Figaro.

History and profile
TV Magazine was started in 1987. The magazine had been published by Hachette Filipacchi until 2001 when it began to be published Quebecor World Inc. It is part of the Le Figaro group.

Circulation
TV Magazine sold four million copies in October 1998. It was the second best-selling television magazine worldwide with a circulation of 4,489,000 copies in 2001. In 2006, the magazine had a circulation of 5,329,711, having suffered a small decline from 5,677,411 copies in 2002. The circulation of the magazine was 5,152,112 copies in 2014.

Other uses
'TV magazine' is also used in English-speaking countries as a generic name for any television listings magazine.

References

External links

1987 establishments in France
Magazines published in France
French-language magazines
Weekly magazines published in France
Listings magazines
Magazines established in 1987
Television magazines
Magazines published in Paris